Lord Cathcart was launched at Jarrow in 1808. Between  1815 and 1819 she traded with the East Indies and India. She was trading with Quebec when she foundered in 1821 in the Atlantic.

Career
Lord Cathcart entered the Register of Shipping in 1809 with West, master, T&R Brown, owner, and trade London transport.  

The Register of Shipping reports the following information:

Captain Ross sailed Lord Cathcart to Calcutta. On Rosss return to Britain, Captain Brown replaced Ross.

Fate
On 29 April 1821 as Lord Cathcart, Banks, master, was sailing from London to Quebec, a heavy sea struck her. She became so leaky her crew abandoned Lord Cathcart in a sinking condition in position . Neptune, of Jersey, was bound to Newfoundland when she picked up the crew from their boats the next day. On 11 May Neptune put the crew on Traveller, which was coming from Jamaica; Traveller took the crew to Leith.

Citations and references
Citations

References
Ċ

1808 ships
Ships built by Temple shipbuilders
Age of Sail merchant ships of England
Maritime incidents in April 1821